Whatever Tickles Your Fancy is the third solo album by Irish folk musician Christy Moore, released in 1975.

Since his last album Prosperous in 1972, Christy had recorded three albums with Planxty. He left Planxty soon after, only to realise he had no profile as a solo artist in Ireland. Through playing with Jimmy Faulkner, Declan McNelis, and later Kevin Burke, they soon started to form the basis for an album recording.

The album was recorded in Ashling Studios in Rathgar.

Track listing 
All tracks are Traditional compositions, arranged by Christy Moore; except where indicated
 "Home by Barna"
 "January Man" (Dave Goulder)
 "The Moving on Song (Go! Move! Shift!)" (Ewan MacColl)
 "Bunch of Thyme"
 "Tippin' it Up to Nancy"
 "The Ballad of Timothy Evans" (Ewan MacColl, Peggy Seeger)
 "Who Put the Blood"
 "One Last Cold Kiss" (Felix Pappalardi, Gail Collins)
 "Trip to Roscoff" (Christy Moore)
 "Van Diemen's Land" (Traditional; arranged by Christy Moore and Dónal Lunny)

Personnel 
 Christy Moore – vocals, guitar, sleeve design
 Jimmy Faulkner – electric and acoustic guitars
 Dónal Lunny – guitar, bouzouki, bodhrán, Moog synthesizer, vocals
 Declan McNelis – bass
 Kevin Burke – fiddle
 Robbie Brennan – drums

References

External links 
 Christy Moore web-site

Christy Moore albums
1975 albums
Polydor Records albums